Aloha Vet is an American factual television series that followed the late Dr. Scott Sims as he traveled Hawaii in the course of his veterinary career. Sims was in talks for a second season when he was diagnosed with bladder cancer, which he died of two months later on July 25, 2015.

Synopsis 
Scott Sims DVM, was a large and small animal veterinarian in Kauai, Hawaii, who owned and operated the Pegasus Veterinary Clinic from his Kauai estate. He traveled by specially fitted out Lexus suv, ATV, horseback, or in his from-a-kit, home-built, single-engine, single-prop plane to visit sick and injured animals of all kinds on multiple Hawaiian Islands, including his home island of Kauai, Oahu, Maui, Molokai, and the Island of Hawaii.

Development 
The idea for the series was presented to Sims by the show's production company, Shine America, after Sims appeared in a segment of a reality show featuring professional surfer Laird Hamilton.  Eden Gaha and Mike Aho co-produced the series for Shine America as part of their expansion into the factual television genre.

Filming began in 2014. On September 24, 2014, Nat Geo Wild confirmed that the eight-episode series would air in the spring of 2015. The show premiered on March 21, 2015.

Sims was in talks for a second season when he was diagnosed with bladder cancer, which he died of two months later on July 25, 2015 at the age of 59.

Episodes 
The series had one season which included 8 episodes that aired from March 21, 2015 to May 9, 2015 on Nat Geo Wild.

References

External links 
 

Television shows set in Hawaii
English-language television shows
Television shows filmed in Hawaii
2015 American television series debuts
2015 American television series endings